is a Japanese former water polo player who competed and ranked 11th in the 1984 Summer Olympics.

References

1961 births
Living people
Japanese male water polo players
Olympic water polo players of Japan
Water polo players at the 1984 Summer Olympics
20th-century Japanese people
21st-century Japanese people